Paraegista is a genus of air-breathing land snails, terrestrial pulmonate gastropod mollusks in the family Bradybaenidae.

Species
Species within the genus Aegista include:
 Paraegista apoiensis

References

 Nomenclator Zoologicus info

 
Bradybaenidae
Taxonomy articles created by Polbot